Saraydan (also Romanized as Sarāydān; also known as Sāradān and Sāygān) is a village in Abtar Rural District, in the Central District of Iranshahr County, Sistan and Baluchestan Province, Iran. At the 2006 census, its population was 610, in 114 families.

References 

Populated places in Iranshahr County